Jelapang may refer to:
 Jelapang, Perak, town in Malaysia
 Jelapang LRT station, in Singapore 
 Jalan Jelapang, Perak state route